Saidabad (also Romanized as Sa‘īdābād; also known as Sa‘dābād) is a village in Shebli Rural District of the Central District of Bostanabad County, East Azerbaijan province, Iran. At the 2006 census, its population was 3,199 in 913 households. The following census in 2011 counted 3,119 people in 882 households. The latest census in 2016 showed a population of 3,054 people in 858 households; it was the largest village in its rural district.

References 

Bostanabad County

Populated places in East Azerbaijan Province

Populated places in Bostanabad County